The Berks and Hants Canal, incorporated as the Berkshire and Hampshire Junction Canal Company, was a proposed canal in the English counties of Berkshire and Hampshire. Proposals for the waterway originate after the completion of the Kennet and Avon Canal and the Basingstoke Canal in the 1790s, with a view to connecting the two canals.

Proposals
The first proposal was put forward at a meeting of the Kennet and Avon Canal Company on 7 February 1794 by Mr Best of Basingstoke. Best proposed a junction on the Kennet and Avon Canal near Hamstead Marshall, linking to the Basingstoke Canal at Old Basing.

A later suggestion for connecting the waterways was tabled by Ralph Dodd in the early 1800s, who suggested a link to Basingstoke from the Andover Canal near Fullerton, with a divergent canal at Whitchurch to Hamstead Marshall.

A third proposal was made by the Kennet and Avon Canal Company in the 1810s, which was surveyed by John Rennie. Rennie recommended a  canal from Hamstead Marshall to Old Basing, via Brimpton and Tadley. A short flight of locks would have brought the canal southward out of the Kennet Valley before crossing the river Enborne near Shalford Bridge. Three more locks would have taken the canal out of the Enborne valley to the south of Brimpton. This long pound would have had a  tunnel traversing the north side of Browning Hill near Baughurst; the tunnel portals would have been near the Baughurst turnpike (at Axmansford) to the west and near St Peter's Church to the east. This proposal was opposed by the Thames authorities, and was likely met with opposition from the Basingstoke Canal company.

Rennie died in 1821. Three years later, his proposal was amended by his junior, Francis Giles, who surveyed a similar but shorter route totalling . Rather than diverging from the Kennet and Avon to the west of Newbury, Giles's route left the Kennet and Avon Canal between Midgham Lock and Heale's Lock, running south to Brimpton before meeting with Rennie's route. Giles's proposal had aqueducts over the River Enborne, the Bow Brook and the River Loddon, and totalled 38 bridges and approximately 12 locks. The project was met with financial support totalling over £70,000, although the proposed cost of the construction was £105,000 and the majority of local landowners opposed the plans. A meeting at The Hind's Head in Aldermaston was held in January 1825 to rally for the opposition of the canal. When the bill reached parliamentary sessions, it was rejected by Parliamentary Committee. He made an amendment the following year to provide a pumping station by the River Enborne at Ashford Hill, although this resubmitted bill was rejected in 1826.

With the Basingstoke Canal un-navigable beyond the fallen Greywell Tunnel, the Basingstoke Canal Society are proponents of a canal linking the two waterways. However, rather than a route via Tadley, a due-north canal connecting Greywell with the Kennet and Avon between Burghfield and Southcote Locks is suggested.

References 

Proposed canals
History of Berkshire
History of Hampshire
Kennet and Avon Canal
Basingstoke Canal
Transport in Berkshire
Transport in Hampshire
1820s establishments in England